The Nightingale and the Rose may refer to:

In literature
"The Nightingale and the Rose", a story in The Happy Prince and Other Tales by Oscar Wilde
The nightingale and the rose, a metaphor prevalent in Diwan collections of Persian and Ottoman poetry

In music
"The Nightingale and the Rose", song no. 2 from Nikolai Rimsky-Korsakov's song cycle Four Songs, Op. 2 (1865–1866)
The Nightingale and the Rose, Op. 54, 1911 cantata by Henry Kimball Hadley
The Nightingale and the Rose, 1927 opera by Hooper Brewster-Jones
The Nightingale and the Rose, 1927 incidental music/ballet after Wilde by Harold Fraser-Simson
Rosa rossa, 1938 opera after Wilde, by 
Lakstigala un roze, 1938 ballet after Wilde by Jānis Kalniņš
El Ruiseñor i la Rosa, 1958 ballet by Matilde Salvador
The Nightingale and the Rose, 1973 opera after Wilde, by Margaret Garwood
The Nightingale and the Rose, 1983 ballet by David Earl
The Nightingale and the Rose (opera), 1994 chamber opera after Wilde, by Elena Firsova
"The Rose and the Nightingale", 1996 impromptu for piano by Ian Venables
The Nightingale and the Rose (ballet), 2007 ballet by Christopher Wheeldon to music by Bright Sheng
The Nightingale and the Rose, 2016 chamber opera by Bertie Baigent

In film
"The Nightingale and the Rose", 2012 short film after Wilde, by Del Kathryn Barton